This is a list of members of the Western Australian Legislative Council from 22 May 1920 to 21 May 1922. The chamber had 30 seats made up of ten provinces each electing three members, on a system of rotation whereby one-third of the members would retire at each biennial election.

Notes
 On 15 April 1921, South-West Province Nationalist MLC Ephraim Clarke died. Country candidate Francis Willmott won the resulting by-election on 21 May 1921.

Sources
 
 
 

Members of Western Australian parliaments by term